East Las Vegas may refer to one of two places in the United States of America:
Whitney, Nevada, formerly called East Las Vegas
A former town in New Mexico, now part of Las Vegas, New Mexico.